Tough, also known as Johnny Tough, is a 1974 blaxploitation film about a young teenager who rebels against authority.

The film is a homage to The 400 Blows (1959).

Cast
 Dion Gossett as Johnny Banes
 Christopher Townes as Chris
 Renny Roker as Phil Banes
 Rich Holmes as Mr. Bishop
 Sandy Reed as Denise Banes
 Philip Hadler as David
 Detra Piernas as Bonnie
 Mary Bailey
 Shawn Bailey

Reception
A. H. Weiler of The New York Times called the performances from the young actors "natural and convincing," but found that the film "states its intentions honestly but superficially. The emotion generated is rarely equal to the drama's good intentions." Gene Siskel of the Chicago Tribune gave the film zero stars out of four, calling it a "shameful mess" that blended "a simplistic plea for adults to understand that their behavior influences children" with "a nasty collection of juvenile thrill scenes." Kevin Thomas of the Los Angeles Times was positive and called the film "very poignant. As infuriating as its people can be, they are always recognizably human. Above all, the film goes right to the heart of the matter. [Horace] Jackson gets splendid performances all around and demonstrates a special gift for handling kids."

See also
 List of American films of 1974

References

External links

Tough at TCMDB

1974 films
Blaxploitation films
1974 drama films
American drama films
1970s English-language films
1970s American films